Bessa is a Portuguese surname. Notable people with the surname include:

Adam Bessa (born 1992), French-Tunisian actor
Adriano Bessa (born 1976), Portuguese footballer
Agustina Bessa-Luís (1922–2019), Portuguese writer
Daniel Bessa (born 1993), Brazilian footballer
Diogo Bessa (born 1999), Portuguese footballer
Éber Bessa (born 1992), Brazilian footballer
João Paulo Bessa (born 1947), Portuguese rugby union footballer and coach

Portuguese-language surnames